David Richard Heitmeier (born 1961) is an American politician. He served as a Democratic member for the 7th district of the Louisiana State Senate.

Born in Algiers, New Orleans, Heitmeier attended the University of Louisiana at Lafayette, where he earned his Bachelor of Science degree in 1984. He then attended the University of Houston, graduating in 1987.

In 2008, Heitmeier was elected to represent the 7th district in the Louisiana State Senate, succeeding his brother Francis C. Heitmeier, who had reached the term limit. In 2016, he was succeeded by Troy Carter.

References 

1961 births
Living people
Politicians from New Orleans
Democratic Party Louisiana state senators
21st-century American politicians
University of Louisiana at Lafayette alumni
University of Houston alumni